Hukuntsi Airport  is an airport serving the village of Hukuntsi in the Kgalagadi District of Botswana.

See also

Transport in Botswana
List of airports in Botswana

References

External links
OpenStreetMap - Hukuntsi
OurAirports - Hukuntsi
FallingRain HUK

Airports in Botswana
Kgalagadi District